John McCall Zerwas, Sr. (born March 24, 1955), is a physician from Richmond, Texas, who was a Republican member of the Texas House of Representatives. He served as the representative for House District 28, which is primarily located in Fort Bend County. Zerwas was appointed executive vice chancellor for health affairs for the University of Texas System and assumed office on October 1, 2019. He resigned his House seat effective September 30, 2019.

Personal life 
Zerwas and his late wife, Cindy Hughes, graduated in 1973 from Bellaire High School and married in 1978. After graduating from the University of Houston, Zerwas earned his medical degree at Baylor College of Medicine in 1980 and started a full-time practice in 1985.

On March 1, 2012, Cindy was diagnosed with a brain tumor known as glioblastoma multiforme. She died on August 20, 2013.

Zerwas helped form the First Colony Church of Christ, and was one of its first deacons where his duties included forming the children’s education and children’s worship programs. He worked with the Boy Scouts of America to establish a troop in the Pecan Grove area, serving as cub master and den leader for several years. He also worked with the boys during the summer camp programs. He has participated in medical missions to Guatemala with the group Faith in Practice where he provided anesthesiology for charity surgeries.

John and his wife Sylvia Haist married in December 2015 and reside in Richmond; they together have six children and seven grandchildren: Isabella, Matthew, Dashel, Oliver, Beatrice, Tinley, and Harlow.

Background 
Zerwas practices anesthesiology with US Anesthesia Partners (USAP), a group he co-founded and in which he remains active in the operations of the partnership. He founded his previous practice, Greater Houston Anesthesiology (GHA), in 1985, and served as president of that clinical practice from 1996 to 2000.

Zerwas served as President of the Memorial Hermann Health Network Providers from 2007–2009, and Chief Medical Officer of the Memorial Hermann Healthcare System in Houston from 2003-2009.

Zerwas served as the President of the American Society of Anesthesiologists (ASA) in 2013. A member of the Texas Society of Anesthesiologists, he served as President of the organization from 1996-1997. He is also a member of the Texas Medical Association.

Texas House of Representatives 
Zerwas was the representative for District 28, which comprises the northwest portion of Fort Bend County. Municipalities (in whole or in part) in the district include Fulshear, Simonton, Weston Lakes, Orchard, Katy, and Rosenberg. It also includes approximately 2,000 residents of the Fort Bend County portion of Houston.

2018 reelection
Zerwas won his seventh legislative term in the general election held on November 6, 2018. With 44,306 votes (54.2 percent), he defeated Democrat, Meghan Scoggins, who polled 37,427 (45.8 percent).

References

External links

Texas House of Representatives - Rep. John Zerwas official TX House of Representatives website
johnzerwas.com official campaign website
"Project Vote Smart"

1955 births
Living people
Republican Party members of the Texas House of Representatives
Bellaire High School (Bellaire, Texas) alumni
University of Houston alumni
Baylor College of Medicine alumni
American anesthesiologists
21st-century American politicians
People from Richmond, Texas
American members of the Churches of Christ